Espírito Santo (literally Holy Spirit in English) is a neighbourhood (bairro) in the city of Porto Alegre, the state capital of Rio Grande do Sul, in Brazil. It was created by Law 6704 from November 19, 1990.

Neighbourhoods in Porto Alegre